Bert Olav Holmquist (15 November 1936 – 26 March 2020) was a Swedish trombonist who was active in the European music scene since the 1960s. Holmquist was born in Skellefteå. A self-taught musician, he began his career in a Swedish armed forces band (I20). He began playing tuba, then switched to valve trombone, and then to slide trombone. As a freelance musician, he worked for the Swedish Radio big band in 1963 but continued to freelance throughout the 1960s. During this period, he often worked with Björn Ulvaeus and Benny Andersson, who were later members of ABBA. He also worked regularly with American musician Quincy Jones.

In 1971, Holmquist joined the Swiss Radio big band, and in 1976 he moved to Berlin as a member of the RIAS (Radio in the American Sector) big band. In 1978, he became a member of the James Last Orchestra, a position he held until 2013. He performed with Kai Warner, Freddy Quinn, Jerry Lewis, The Manhattan Transfer, and Lill Lindfors.

Holmquist died on 26 March 2020, after suffering from COVID-19 and Alzheimer's disease.

References

External links

Swedish trombonists
2020 deaths
1936 births
People from Skellefteå Municipality
21st-century trombonists
Deaths from the COVID-19 pandemic in Sweden
20th-century trombonists
20th-century Swedish musicians
21st-century Swedish musicians
20th-century Swedish male musicians
21st-century Swedish male musicians